Lao Airlines Flight 301 was a scheduled domestic passenger flight from Vientiane to Pakse, Laos. On 16 October 2013, the ATR 72-600 aircraft operating the flight crashed into the Mekong River near Pakse, killing all 49 people on board. The accident was the first involving an ATR 72-600 and the deadliest ever to occur on Laotian soil.

The investigation report concluded that the probable cause of the accident was the flight crew's failure to properly execute the published missed approach procedure following the aborted landing at Pakse airport.

Accident

The aircraft was operating a scheduled domestic passenger flight from Wattay International Airport, Vientiane to Pakse International Airport, Pakse, Laos. The aircraft had already gone around once due to poor weather and was in the downwind leg for another approach when it crashed into a riverbank and was deflected into the nearby river. All five crew and 44 passengers on board were killed.

Marks on the ground indicated that the aircraft landed heavily on the ground before entering the Mekong. The weather was reported to be poor at the time of the accident due to the remnants of Typhoon Nari affecting southern Laos.

Recovery of the victims and wreckage was hampered by the fast-flowing, deep waters of the Mekong. To assist with the search, 50 divers from Thailand were brought in. Eighteen of the victims had been recovered as of 18 October. By 23 October 44 of the 49 victims had been recovered. Identification had been confirmed for 27 of them.

Aircraft
The aircraft involved was an ATR 72-600, registration RDPL-34233, serial number 1071, with a total flying time of just over 700 hours since its delivery to Lao Airlines 7 months before, in March 2013.

Passengers and crew
The victims were of eleven nationalities. Of the 44 passengers on board, 16 were Laotian, as were four of the five crew. The pilot was a Cambodian national. The remaining casualties consisted of seven French nationals, six Australians, five Thais, three South Koreans, three Vietnamese, and one each from China, Taiwan, Malaysia and the United States. At least two children, both from Australia, were among the dead. Early reports that a Canadian was on board were incorrect, since it was later determined that the individual was a Vietnamese national.

The pilots were captain Yong Som (57), who had logged 5,600 flying hours of which 3,200 on the ATR-72, and first officer Soulisack Houvanthong (22), who had logged around 400 hours of flying experience.

Investigation
The Laotian Department of Civil Aviation opened an investigation into the accident. The aircraft's manufacturer ATR and the French Bureau of Enquiry and Analysis for Civil Aviation Safety (BEA) assisted them. The BEA sent four investigators to Laos.

The wreckage of the aircraft was lifted from the Mekong on 22 October 2013. Within three weeks from the accident, both the flight data recorder and the cockpit voice recorder were successfully recovered from the Mekong.

According to the official investigation report, released in  November 2014, the probable cause of the accident was the flight crew's failure to execute properly the published missed approach procedure, which resulted in the aircraft flying into terrain. A sudden change of weather conditions and an improperly executed published instrument approach necessitated the go-around. The recordings show that the flight crew initiated a right turn according to the lateral missed approach trajectory without succeeding in reaching the vertical trajectory. When the flight crew realized that the altitude was too low, the pilot flying over-reacted, which led to a high pitch attitude of 33°. It then struck trees. The fuselage collided with the bank and plunged into the river.

See also
 Garuda Indonesia Flight 200
 Lion Air Flight 904

References

External links
 "Press Release on the Final Report Aircraft Accident Investigation-QV 301" (ພິທີ ຖະແຫຼງການ ກ່ຽວກັບຜົນການສຶບສວນ-ສອບສວນ ອຸປະຕິເຫດເຮືອບິນ ATR 72 ຖ້ຽວບິນ QV 301 ຕົກທີ່ ປາກເຊ). Aircraft Accident Investigation Committee (AAIC), Ministry of Public Works and Transport
 Press Release Summary of final report (Archive) – Black and white version for printing (Archive)
 Press Release Summary of final report (Archive) – Black and white version for printing (Archive) 
 Aircraft Accident Investigation Committee (AAIC), Ministry of Public Works and Transport
 "ວນທ21ຕຸລາ2013,ເວລາ9:00ໂມງ" (Archive) 
 "ກອງປະຊຸມປຶກສາຫາລື ເພື່ອສືບຕໍ່ຊອກຄົ້ນຊາກສົບຜູ້ຖືກເຄາະຮ້າຍ ແລະ ຊິ້ນສ່ວນເຮືອບິນ ATR 72 ຂອງສາຍການບິນລາວ" (Archive) 
 Announcement – Lao Airlines (Documents available in English and Lao) (Archive)

2013 in Laos
Accidents and incidents involving the ATR 72
Aviation accidents and incidents in 2013
Aviation accidents and incidents in Laos
Mekong River
October 2013 events in Asia
Aviation accidents and incidents involving controlled flight into terrain